MIGS may refer to: 

 The Luton Town MIGs, a football firm following English side Luton Town
 The Montreal International Games Summit
 Montreal Institute for Genocide and Human Rights Studies
 Miguel Cabrera
 Metal-induced gap states
 Mastercard Internet Gateway Service, a module for paying by Credit Card over the Internet
 Aircraft manufactured by the Russian company Mikoyan